7-Toku is the second album by Space Streakings. It was released on October 3, 1994, by Skin Graft Records.

Critical reception
The Encyclopedia of Popular Music called the album "a vivid new listening experience rather than a formulaic copy of a western style." Trouser Press wrote: "Far more boisterous and a lot less methodical than American industrialists, the quartet rushes in and around its tracks, layering bits on to a point of distraction in which chaos would come as a welcome relief." The Chicago Reader wrote that the album "finds this whacked foursome proffering more cartoonish, progged-out approximations of the infinitely superior Boredoms."

Track listing

Personnel 
Adapted from 7-Toku liner notes.

Space Streakings
 Captain Insect – bass guitar, vocals, programming
 Kame Bazooka – alto saxophone, vocals, horns
 Karate Condor – turntables, vocals, guitar
 Screaming Stomach – guitar, vocals, trumpet, kazoo

Production and design
 Steve Albini – production, engineering, recording
 Nobtack Koike – cover art, illustrations

Release history

References

External links 
 

1994 albums
Albums produced by Steve Albini
Skin Graft Records albums
Space Streakings albums